O'Bannon Homestead, also known as Schuyler Stock Farm, Steeple House, and Four Leaf Clover Farm, is a historic home and farm complex located near Garden City, Cass County, Missouri. The farmhouse was built in 1893, and is a two-story, rectangular, frame dwelling with Queen Anne style embellishments.  It features stained glass, an encircling verandah, an octagonal tower and decorative spindle, spool and shingle work.  Also on the property are six contributing outbuildings: a wash house / smokehouse, work house, pump house, chicken house, outhouse, and barn.

It was listed on the National Register of Historic Places in 1979.

References

Houses on the National Register of Historic Places in Missouri
Farms on the National Register of Historic Places in Missouri
Queen Anne architecture in Missouri
Houses completed in 1893
Buildings and structures in Cass County, Missouri
National Register of Historic Places in Cass County, Missouri